R78 may refer to:

 1.R-78 opening, a shogi opening
 , a destroyer of the Royal Navy